Kavi Bilhana was an 11th-century Kashmiri poet. He is known for his love poem, the Caurapañcāśikā.

According to legend,  Bilhana fell in love with the daughter of King Madanabhirama, Princess Yaminipurnatilaka, and had a secretive love affair. Bilhana  kavi came to rajya for to learn Chandassu . They were discovered, and Bilhana was thrown into prison. While awaiting judgement, he wrote the Caurapâñcâśikâ, a fifty-stanza love poem, not knowing whether he would be sent into exile or die on the gallows. It is unknown what fate Bilhana encountered. Nevertheless, his poem was transmitted orally around India. There are several versions, including ones from South India which had a happy ending; the Kashmiri version does not specify what the outcome was. The Caurapâñcâśikâ was first translated into a European language, French, in 1848. Subsequently, it was translated several other times. Notable translations are those of Sir Edwin Arnold(London 1896) and Edward Powys Mathers (Oxford, 1919) titled Black Marigolds. This latter version was quoted extensively by John Steinbeck in Cannery Row.

Bilhana left his homeland in search of fame and fortune.  He wandered through Mathura, Kanuj, Prayaga, Varanasi, Somnath, Kalyan and Rameswaram but luck eluded him. But while trekking back through Kalyan, Western Chalukya Empire King Vikramaditya VI appointed him as Vidyapathi. Bilhana rewarded his patron by composing in his honor an epic Vikramankadevacharita.

Bilhana is from the period of time when Sanskrit continued to be the language of literature, and is a very important poet of Kashmir from the Medieval period of Indian literature.

See also
Bilhana, a 1948 film directed by B. N. Rao
Bilhana, a 1948 film directed by K. V. Srinivasan

References

Further reading
 
 Introduction to The Secret Delights of Love, Peter Pauper Press (1966).

External links
Black Marigolds, at sacred-texts.com
The Caurapâñcâśikâ, at The Internet Archive
The Caurapâñcâśikâ (The Love-Thief) Poesy rendering into English 2013

Kashmiri people
Kashmiri writers
Kashmiri literature
Hindu poets
Kashmiri poets
History of Kashmir
11th-century Indian poets
Indian male poets